Alexey Sitnikov may refer to:
 Alexei Sitnikov, ice dancer
 Alexey Sitnikov (politician), Russian politician